Daria Niya Owen (born 4 April 1988) is an American-born Guyanese retired footballer who played as a midfielder and a centre back. She has been a member of the Guyana women's national team.

Early life
Owen was raised in Snellville, Georgia.

High school and college career
Owen attended the Shiloh High School in her hometown. After graduating there, she joined the Georgia College & State University in Milledgeville, Georgia.

International career
Owen qualified to play for Guyana through her father and her paternal grandparents. She capped for the Lady Jags at senior level during the 2010 CONCACAF Women's World Cup Qualifying qualification.

International goals
Scores and results list Guyana's goal tally first

See also
List of Guyana women's international footballers

References

1988 births
Living people
Citizens of Guyana through descent
Guyanese women's footballers
Women's association football midfielders
Women's association football central defenders
Guyana women's international footballers
People from Snellville, Georgia
Sportspeople from the Atlanta metropolitan area
Soccer players from Georgia (U.S. state)
American women's soccer players
Georgia College & State University alumni
African-American women's soccer players
American sportspeople of Guyanese descent
21st-century African-American sportspeople
20th-century African-American people
20th-century African-American women
21st-century African-American women